Yakov Sverdlov', is a 1940 Soviet drama film directed by Sergei Yutkevich.

Plot 
The film tells about the life and work of the Chairman of the Central Executive Committee Yakov Sverdlov.

Starring 
 Leonid Lyubashevsky as Yakov Sverdlov
 Maksim Shtraukh as Lenin
 Andro Kobaladze as Stalin
 Pavel Kadochnikov as Maxim Gorky
 Nikolay Kryuchkov as Trofimow 
 Irina Fedotova as Zina Mironov
 Nikolay Gorlov as Mironov
 Ivan Nazarov as Akim
 Nikolai Okhlopkov as Feodor Chaliapin
 Igor Smirnov as Lenka Sukhov child
 Kseniya Tarasova as Anisa Sukhov
 Vladimir Vladislavskiy as Kazimir Petrovich
 Ivan Lyubeznov

References

External links 
 

1940 films
1940s Russian-language films
Soviet drama films
1940 drama films
Soviet black-and-white films